McGregor Links is a golf club located just outside Saratoga Springs, New York in the town of Wilton. As of 2015, McGregor is the fifth-largest course in the Capital District. The course is semi-private; it is open to the public every day but Tuesday and Thursday.

McGregor Links has been the site of seven New York State Amateur Golf Championships and two US Open local qualifiers. It is the home course of Skidmore College's golf team.

The course was built in 1921 by former state senator, businessman, and attorney Edgar T. Brackett.  It was designed by Devereux Emmet, a prolific designer responsible for more than 150 courses, including the Blue course at the Congressional Country Club in Bethesda, Maryland. The clubhouse was designed by Alfred Hopkins. At the time of construction, Walter Hagen wrote that the course would be a rival to the Lido Golf Club, the National Links, and Pine Valley, known as the "Big Three". In 1923, Brackett sold the course to the McGregor Holding Corporation, chartered by Charles C. VanDeusen, Newman E. Wait, and Clarence Knapp.

References

External links
 Official site
  (with photographs)
 

Golf clubs and courses in New York (state)
Golf clubs and courses designed by Devereux Emmet
1921 establishments in New York (state)